For Long Tomorrow is the second studio album released by Japanese math rock band toe.

Reception
In an interview with Seattle Post-Intelligencer, Cadence Wu of Blogcritics said that "Toe's second album may sound at times like an extension of their debut, but the level of experimentation in For Long Tomorrow provides the light, upbeat sound the band was looking for".

Track listing

References

2009 albums
Toe (band) albums